Cleavage stimulation factor 64 kDa subunit is a protein that in humans is encoded by the CSTF2 gene.

This gene encodes a nuclear protein with an RRM (RNA recognition motif) domain. The protein is a member of the cleavage stimulation factor (CSTF) complex that is involved in the 3' end cleavage and polyadenylation of pre-mRNAs. Specifically, this protein binds GU-rich elements within the 3'-untranslated region of mRNAs.

Interactions
CSTF2 has been shown to interact with CSTF3, SUB1, SYMPK, BARD1 and BRCA1.

References

External links

Further reading